His All-Time Greatest Comic Hits is a 10-track collection of previously recorded songs by Ray Stevens, released in 1990 by Curb Records. One of the qualities that makes this collection identifiable is that it concentrates solely on Stevens' songs of novelty and comedy. However, the versions of certain songs on this compilation are not original recordings or the most popular versions; the version of "Gitarzan" is the album version that begins with cheering and applauding of an audience; "Ahab, the Arab" is a re-recording that Stevens made for his album Gitarzan; "Freddie Feelgood" is the album version from Gitarzan that contains audience noises.

Track listing

Personnel
Ray Stevens – producer, arranger
Fred Foster – producer
Jim Malloy – producer
Neuman, Walker & Associates – art direction and design
Marguerite Luciani – album coordination

1990 compilation albums
Curb Records compilation albums
Ray Stevens compilation albums